Cable is the name of multiple comic book titles featuring the character Cable and published by Marvel Comics, beginning with the original Cable comic book series which debuted in 1993.

Publication history
In 1992, the character was featured in his first solo series, a two issue miniseries, titled Cable: Blood and Metal, written by Fabian Nicieza, pencilled by John Romita, Jr., and inked by Dan Green, published in October and November of that year.

Volume 1
Shortly after Blood and Metal, Cable was given his own ongoing series titled Cable. The book initially had trouble finding a stable creative team. A writer/penciller team would complete no more than three issues in a row until Jeph Loeb and Ian Churchill began work on issue #20 and finish on #35 (though with a gap between issues #20 and #21 due to the Age of Apocalypse event). Loeb and Churchill provided the first instance of stability, working together on 15 of the 20 issues from #20–39. During their run, they explored characters in Cable's past, his feeling of responsibility toward Nathan Grey, his relationship with Domino and Blaquesmith, and further adventures with Kane, the Sugar Man, and the Microverse.

Cable #34–35 were part of the "Onslaught" storyline, which was a top vote getter for the Comics Buyer's Guide Fan Award for Favorite Comic-Book Story for 1997.

The series ran for 107 issues from May 1993 until September 2002 before being relaunched as Soldier X, which lasted 12 more issues until Aug. 2003.

After his solo series ended, he was paired with the mercenary Deadpool in a new ongoing series titled Cable & Deadpool.

Volume 2

In 2008, Marvel Comics released Cable vol. 2, a new ongoing series by Duane Swierczynski and artist Ariel Olivetti. This new series directly follows the events of "Messiah Complex". The series features Cable, and the messianic child's time traveling adventures. The dangers of the future and pursuit by Bishop are balanced with the humor of "Cable the soldier" becoming "Cable the Nanny."

According to Duane Swierczynski, although the writer "missed Cable's heyday in the early 1990s," Cable is "[his] kind of antihero—the cryptic, Man with No Name of mutantkind. If [Swierczynski had] quibbles with the Cable of yesteryear, it's that he was just a tad too powerful. [Cable] could port around the world at will, fetch beer from the fridge with the power of his mind, and then crush said beer can against his metallic love handle." When asked whether Nathan Summers was a tragic character in his mind, Swierczynski replied that, "Cable's still a bad ass soldier, make no mistake. But [the mission to protect Hope Summers in X-Men: Messiah War] is breaking him down like he's never been broken down before" and said that "[the readers are] going to see Cable struggling with a new bodily problem, one directly borne out of his experiences in 'Messiah War.'"

In 2009, Cable vol. 2 had a seven-issue crossover with X-Force, X-Force/Cable: Messiah War, which is the second story in a three-part storyline that began in X-Men: Messiah Complex.

Cable was canceled in April 2010 with issue #25 (the final issue being called Deadpool and Cable #25).

Volume 3
A third volume of Cable, written by James Robinson and drawn by Carlos Pacheco, was launched in April 2017 as part of the ResurrXion relaunch. The series ran for five issues before it was renumbered under legacy issue numbering as part of Marvel's Legacy relaunch, starting with #150. Under this legacy numbering, the title was written by Ed Brisson (#150-154) and Zac Thompson and Lonnie Nadler (#155-159), and drawn by Jon Malin (#150-154) and German Peralta (#155-159).

Volume 4

Cable was relaunched in March 2020 as part of Dawn of X. Written by Gerry Duggan and drawn by Phil Noto, the series focuses on the younger version of Cable who is at the center of Krakoa's teenage revolution.

Cast

Prints

Collected editions

Volume 1 (1993)

Oversized Hardcovers

Volume 2 (2008)

Volume 3 (2017)

Volume 4 (2020)

References

1993 comics debuts
Comics about time travel
Comics by Fabian Nicieza
X-Men titles